The 1935–36 season First Division match between Aston Villa and Arsenal at Villa Park took place on 14 December 1935. Arsenal won the fixture 7–1 with all of their seven goals scored by striker Ted Drake, a record haul for a top flight fixture, and a record for any division at the time. The top-flight record still stands today.

Background

Aston Villa and Arsenal enjoyed a great rivalry at the time and there had been several memorable contests between the sides since 1930. Aston Villa sat bottom of the league but had just invested some £24,000 in a number of new players and were expected to improve considerably as a result.
Arsenal were missing star player Alex James and striker Ted Drake had a heavily strapped knee.

Match details

Summary
Despite playing six internationals, Aston Villa were losing 3–0 at half time after a Drake hat-trick. He had a double hat-trick by the hour, with Villa then scoring their only goal through Jack Palethorpe. Drake then had an effort hit the crossbar and bounce downwards though the goal was disallowed with officials ruling the ball had not crossed the line. However, Drake still secured the goal-scoring record in the final minute of the game. In total, Drake had just nine shots, all on target with one saved.

Records
Drake's seven goals equalled the total Jimmy Ross was alleged to have scored in a game for Preston North End against Stoke City in 1888, though it was not until years later it was established that Ross had only scored four. The record for all divisions was broken just 12 days after Drake's tally by Bunny Bell of Tranmere Rovers in the Football League Third Division North, who scored nine against Oldham Athletic.

Aftermath
Aston Villa went on to be relegated for the first time in their history at the end of the season. Arsenal failed to win a fourth consecutive league title but went on to lift the FA Cup with Drake scoring the only goal of the game.

References

External links
 Archive footage

Arsenal F.C. matches
Aston Villa F.C. matches
Football League First Division matches
History of Birmingham, West Midlands
1935–36 in English football
1930s in Birmingham, West Midlands
December 1935 sports events